Hans Peter Rohr (born 4 September 1943) is a former Swiss alpine skier.

Career
During his career he has achieved 6 results among the top 10 (2 podiums) in the World Cup.

World Cup results
Top 3

References

External links
 
 
 Hans Peter Rohr at Neveitalia

1943 births
Living people
Swiss male alpine skiers
Place of birth missing (living people)